Floral Park is an incorporated village on Long Island, New York, United States.

Floral Park may also refer to:

Floral Park (LIRR station),  a Long Island Rail Road train station
Floral Park, Queens, a neighborhood in New York City
Floral Park, Ontario, a community in Ontario, Canada
Floral Park (Hato Rey), a sector in San Juan, Puerto Rico